The Supreme Court Bar Association (SCBA) is an Indian bar association, comprising the practising lawyers of the Supreme Court of India.  Vikas Singh(Senior Advocate) is the current president of the association, Pradeep Rai(Senior Advocate) is the Vice-president and Rahul Kaushik(Advocate) is the Honorary Secretary.

Notable Former Presidents 
Ashoke Kumar Sen
Kapil Sibal
Ram Jethmalani
Pavani Parameswara Rao
M. N. Krishnamani

See also
 Bar Council of India

References

External links
 Official website

Legal organisations based in India
Organisations based in Delhi
Supreme Court of India
Bar associations of Asia